Ultima Thule is an Estonian rock-band. It has existed since 1986. The leader of the group has been the guitarist and (later) singer Riho Sibul. Ultima Thule has been one of the most influential Estonian  bands of the 1980s and 1990s.  Their style has been characterized as a blend of blues rock with witty lyrics and influences of Estonian folk music.

The original singer of the band, Tõnis Mägi has in the 2000s mainly chosen a solo career as well as the former drummer Peeter Jõgioja (featuring also in 2004 Eurovision song contest with the group Neiokõsõ).

References

External links
 
 
 

Estonian rock music groups
Estonian folk rock groups
Estonian hard rock musical groups
Estonian blues rock musical groups
Musical groups established in 1986
1986 establishments in the Soviet Union